ADMET may refer to:

 ADME-Tox, absorption, distribution, metabolism, and excretion - toxicity in pharmacokinetics
 Acyclic diene metathesis, an olefin metathesis polymerisation method